Valentin Brunel (born 17 December 1996), better known by his stage name Kungs, is a French DJ, record producer and musician. A native of Toulon, he released his first album Layers in 2016 after success with "This Girl", a collaboration with Cookin' on 3 Burners that became an international hit for him, and the follow-ups "Don't You Know" featuring Jamie N Commons and "I Feel So Bad" featuring Ephemerals.

Career
Valentin chose the stage name 'KUNGS' ("mister" in Latvian) after searching online for the translation of the word 'gentleman' in various languages. He began playing music when he was five, playing a djembe that was a gift from his parents. He grew up listening to rock and roll classics with his father, including The Who and The Kooks. He began writing and posting online his own compositions when he was seventeen. His remixes of "Jamming" by Bob Marley and the Wailers and "West Coast" by Lana Del Rey featuring new vocals from Molly both reached several million plays on SoundCloud and YouTube. Kungs's remix of Lost Frequencies' "Are You with Me" achieved more than 16 million views on YouTube. In January 2016, he was the opener of some performances in Europe on David Guetta's Listen Tour.

Kungs released his first extended play This Girl in 2016 following his remix of Cookin' on 3 Burners "This Girl", which reached number 1 in France, Germany and Switzerland and number 2 on the UK Singles Chart in 2016. He has since released the single "Don't You Know" featuring Jamie N Commons and "I Feel So Bad" featuring Ephemerals. Kungs' three 2016 singles were released on his debut album Layers, which was released on 4 November.

On 23 March 2018 Kungs played a live set at the Miami Ultra Music Festival. He followed acts from fellow artists Raiden and Kosuke to perform his individual set on the 2018 Ultra Main Stage.

On 22 July 2018 he performed at the electronic dance music festival Tomorrowland in Belgium.

Discography

Albums

Singles

Promotional singles

Other charting singles

Awards and nominations

Notes

References

External links
 Official website

1996 births
Living people
21st-century French male musicians
Electronic dance music DJs
French DJs
French electronic musicians
French house musicians
French record producers
Musicians from Toulon
Remixers
Tropical house musicians